The 2005 West Coast Conference Baseball Championship Series was held on May 27 through 29, 2005 at Loyola Marymount's home stadium, George C. Page Stadium in Los Angeles, California, and pitted the winners of the conference's two four-team divisions.

Seeding

Results
Game One

Game Two

Game Three

References

West Coast Conference Baseball Championship
Tournament
Baseball in Los Angeles
West Coast Conference Baseball Championship Series
West Coast Conference Baseball Championship Series